Zaheerabad or Zahirabad, is an industrial city and Municipal Council in Sangareddy district of the Indian state of Telangana.

Zahirabad is also the base for visitors of ancient sacred , Ketaki Sangameshwara Swamy Devasthanam at Jharasangam, Siddhhi Vinayaka Temple at Rejinthal and Hazrath Multani Baba Dargah at Metalkunta.

Location

Town name
Zahirabad - The name of the city was coined by a Paigah noble called Nawab Mohammad Zaheeruddin Khan (Nawab Zaheer Yar Jung Bahadur). He was the first born son of Nawab Moin-Ud-Dowlah Bahadur Asman Jah. The Paigah family or clan were a Sufi Islamic aristocratic family of Hyderabad state.

History
Important points in the history of Zaheerabad include the drought of 1972 and the Hyderabad Police Action of 1949.

There is Huge big Methodist Church Located in Prime area church was named in the Memory of Rev.G B Garden Memorial Methodist Church who was a Missionary from America. He served all downtrodden and poor people of Zaheerabad Village. He primarily focused on providing good education to the villagers.At Present there are several people residing out of India in notable positions and are also holding good position in state and central govt. there are plenty of people a positions in Govt.sector who all studied in this Methodist School.

Demographics
In 2001, the census population of Zaheerabad was 140,160. Sixteen percent of people were under six years of age. The rate of literacy was 59.5 percent, higher than the national average. Women were less literate than men (55 percent to 69 percent).

The common languages spoken are Urdu/Deccani Urdu, Telugu, Kannada and Marathi.

 census of India, the urban agglomeration population of the city was 71,166.

Government and politics
Zaheerabad Municipality was constituted in 1952 and is classified as a third grade municipality with 24 election wards. The urban agglomeration includes the municipality of Zahirabad, the census town of Allipur, out growths of Pastapur, Tamadpalle, Hyderabad, Hothi (K) and part of the out growths of Buchnelli village.

Economy
Zaheerabad is an agricultural area. Farming has struggled due to dry lands becoming fallow and the loss of a variety of crop types such as cereals, pulses and oilseeds. The Deccan Development Society (DDS) has assisted local women to become empowered in the economy and in society. In small groups called sangams,  they have succeeded in developing food security and making charity endeavours.

In March 2013, a tractor manufacturer M&M opened near Zahirabad providing employment. Other industries include sugar refining, rubber manufacturing and chemical manufacturing. Mahindra & Mahindra, through its multiple plants in Zaheerabad, provides employment to many young engineers in Zaheerabad and its suburbs.

Jharasangam
In the vicinity of Zahirabad, there is an ancient temple of Lord Shiva, called "Jharasangam ".This is an old Shiva temple known as KETHAKI S

SANGAMESHWARA SWAMY situated at Jharasangam Village and Mandal, Sangareddy District. The Shiva Lingam is said to have been established by Lord Brahma. It is said that Raja Kupendra, king of Surya Vamsha during Krutha Yug was ailing from skin disease and had not found any remedies. One day in his routine hunting it happened to reach the Kethaki Vanam and found a stream, where he washed his body. After reaching home he found that the skin disease was completely cured and in the same night Lord Sangameshwara appeared in a dream, asked the Raja to construct a sanitorium over Shiva Lingam. The Raja Kupendra constructed the temple over Shiva Lingam and converted the stream into a pushkarini and it is also called as Astha Theertha Amrutha Gundam. It is also called as Dakshina Kasi.

Due to historical and religious importance, the people from Karnataka, Maharashtra and Andhra Pradesh (Telangana areas) visit the temple and pay homage to Lord, and perform Gunda Pooja.

It is also said that Brahma after creating the world came to the spot for meditation. Since the existing Bhanakara Lingam has been installed by Brahma, Pujas are being performed by Kethaki flowers (generally Kethaki flowers are not used for puja), and also the Pushkarini which is consisting of eight theerthas (Narayana, Dharna, rushi, Varuna, Soma, Rudra, Indira and Datha) the Lord is called as “Kethaki Sangameshwara.

Transport

RTC buses
ZAHIRABAD - ZHB Tsrtc bus depot runs buses to various places in the state. KSRTC buses also runs from Zahirabad bus station to various parts of the states of Telangana, AP, Maharashtra and Karnataka.

Trains
Trains run from (Zahirabad) to Bangalore, Mangalore , Nanded, Shirdi,  Pune, Visakhapatnam,  Vijayawada, Machlipatnam and Warangal , Hyderabad

Amenities
Typical of an Indian town of its size, Zahirabad has a number of banks, public and independent schools and colleges, shops, hotels, hospitals and other services.

See also
 Zahirabad (Lok Sabha constituency)

References

External links

Towns in Medak district